Kfar Baal, also known as Annaya is a municipality in the Byblos District of Keserwan-Jbeil Governorate, Lebanon. It is 55 kilometers north of Beirut. Kfar Baal has an average elevation of 920 meters above sea level and a total land area of 303 hectares. There were six companies with more than five employees operating in the village as of 2008. Its inhabitants are predominantly Maronite Catholics.

References

Populated places in Byblos District
Maronite Christian communities in Lebanon